Jamie Iain Young (born 25 August 1985) is a professional footballer who plays as a goalkeeper for A-League side Western United. Born in Australia, he was a youth international for England.

Personal life
Born in Brisbane, Australia, Young is of Sri Lankan and Scottish descent.

Young possesses a Bachelor in Exercise and Sport Science, with  Young writing his dissertation on human genomic research in professional football. He had previously spent a number of years combining university studies with football commitments, and had temporarily placed his university studies on hold in July 2016 in order to focus on his football. Young is currently studying a PhD at the University of Queensland on the psychology of sports coaching, with a specific focus on the coach-athlete relationship in Australian football.

Young is an ambassador for the Multicultural Development Association, which helps refugees and migrants settle in Queensland.

Club career
Having grown up in Australia, he attended Padua College, where he played in the First XI as Goalkeeper and also played at Pine Hills, Albany Creek, Easts and QAS at club level. Young moved to England in 2002 to play professional football for Reading. After failing to break into the first team, he was released by Reading on 8 May 2006, and subsequently signed a one-year deal with Wycombe Wanderers on 2 August 2006.

He missed much of the 2007–08 season with a knee injury, but regained fitness by the end of the season. His contract was cancelled by mutual consent in January 2010 after he was informed that he would not be offered a new contract in the summer. He was signed on a non-contract basis by Aldershot Town of League Two on 11 March 2010 as cover for goalkeeper Mikhael Jaimez-Ruiz.

After impressing and establishing himself as the first choice goalkeeper, in the last quarter of the 2009–10 season, where Aldershot Town qualified for the League Two play-offs, Young signed a one-year contract with the club in June 2010. With the arrival of new goalkeeper Ross Worner in the 2011–12 season, Young was demoted to second choice goalkeeper but still managed to make a number of appearances in the later stage of the season when Worner was ruled out with a back injury. On 24 June 2012, Young signed a one-year contract to keep him with Aldershot until 2013.

Young left Aldershot in June 2013 after the club were relegated from the Football League and placed in administration. He played one game for Basingstoke Town in September as cover for their regular goalkeeper before joining fellow Conference South side Whitehawk the following month. After making only one appearance he moved, this time joining Hayes & Yeading United. After making 10 appearances for Hayes & Yeading during its 2013–14 Conference South campaign, Young was released by manager Phil Babb following an on-field altercation with a teammate in a 2–0 defeat to Bath City.

On 10 May 2014, it was reported that Young would return to his hometown to join A-League defending champion Brisbane Roar for the 2014–15 season. Young struggled to adjust to the A-League with fans and even teammate Shane Stefanutto laying the blame on Young for the Roar's less than impressive start to the season. Young kept his first clean sheet in a 4–0 thrashing of the Newcastle Jets, courtesy of an Henrique hat-trick. Due to Michael Theo's wrist injury, sustained in pre-season training, Young played as the first choice goalkeeper for the majority of the season, even in the Elimination Final clash against Adelaide United in which Brisbane lost 2–1. Young played 24 matches for the Roar in the 2014–15 season, keeping five clean-sheets, as well as one clean-sheet in the ACL in Roar's 1–0 win against Urawa Reds.

On 30 April, Young won the golden glove award for best goalkeeper in the A-League at the Dolan Warren Awards.

International career
Although born in Australia, Young has elected to play for England internationally, having been capped for the U20 team to date.

Career statistics

Honours
Individual
 A-League Goalkeeper of the Year: 2017–18
 Brisbane Roar Gary Wilkins Medal: 2017–18, 2018–19
A-Leagues All Star: 2022
 PFA A-League Men Team of the Season: 2017–18, 2019–20, 2021–22

References

External links

England profile at the FA
OzFootball profile

1985 births
Living people
Soccer players from Brisbane
Australian soccer players
English footballers
England youth international footballers
Association football goalkeepers
Reading F.C. players
Rushden & Diamonds F.C. players
Wycombe Wanderers F.C. players
Aldershot Town F.C. players
Basingstoke Town F.C. players
Whitehawk F.C. players
Hayes & Yeading United F.C. players
Brisbane Roar FC players
Western United FC players
English Football League players
National League (English football) players
A-League Men players
Australian expatriate soccer players
People educated at Padua College (Brisbane)
Expatriate footballers in England
English people of Scottish descent
English people of Sri Lankan descent
Australian people of Scottish descent
Australian people of Sri Lankan descent